Leonard Edwin Setzler (born March 18, 1970) is an American politician from the state of Georgia. Since 2005, he has represented the 35th district in the Georgia House of Representatives.

Early life, education, and career before politics
Born in Atlanta, Setzler grew up in the Southeast, primarily South Carolina. He received a B.S. in physics from Furman University in 1992, where he earned the designation of Distinguished Military Graduate. A graduate of the U.S. Army Ranger School, Setzler served on active duty for nine years with assignments in Europe, North Africa, and the Persian Gulf.  Setzler concluded his active duty service as commander of a 211-soldier truck company in the 3rd Infantry Division in Fort Stewart, Georgia.  Since leaving active duty in 2001, Setzler has been a program manager and director in the architecture and engineering industry.

Political career

Elections
Setzler's district, the 35th district, covers parts of northern Cobb County, Georgia. In 2004 and 2006, Setzler was unopposed in the general election. In 2008, Setzler was challenged by Democratic nominee Jason Adams, a middle school teacher in the general election; Setzler received 60.8% of the vote to Adams 39.2%. In 2010, Setzler defeated Democratic nominee Matthew D. Adams, receiving 64.6% to Adams' 35.4%. In 2012, 2014, and 2016, Selzer ran unopposed for reelection.

In 2018, Democratic nominee Salvatore Castellana, a restaurant owner and transportation manager, challenged Setzler for reelection. Setzler won more narrowly, with 52.3% of the vote to Castellana's 47.7%.

Abortion legislation
Since taking office in 2005, Setzler has consistently pushed for anti-abortion legislation including the Women's Right to Know Act (2005), Unborn Victims of Violence Act (2006), Women's Ultrasound Right to Know Act (2007), and a 2012 prohibition on abortion after 22-weeks gestation age when an unborn child has been medically proven to feel pain.

Setzler was the lead sponsor of the Living Infants Fairness & Equality Act (2019) in the Georgia General Assembly a bill that established the legal personhood of the unborn child throughout Georgia law and banned most abortions after about six weeks into a pregnancy. In addition to providing tax and social services benefits to parents of an unborn child, Setzler's bill initially included no exceptions, but he later added exceptions in the House Health & Human Services Committee to balance the liberty interest of mothers with difficult pregnancies with the life interest of the unborn child.

The legislation was opposed by abortion providers and most obstetricians and gynecologists who say that the legislation "would limit a physician's ability to provide medical care and advice that's in the best interest of the patient" and contains language that "could expose doctors to criminal prosecution for following what’s widely considered to be a medically acceptable standard of care." Georgia governor Brian Kemp signed the legislation into law in May 2019, fulfilling a campaign promise to sign into law the nation's most stringent abortion ban. The ACLU of Georgia, Planned Parenthood, and others successfully challenged the legislation and it was found to be unconstitutional in July 2020. Setzler and the other anti-abortion advocates who supported for the legislation sought to use the law as a vehicle to overturn Roe v. Wade.

Other legislation
In addition to being Chairman of the House Committee on Science & Technology, Rep. Setzler has served the Chair of the House Judiciary Noncivil Subcommittee on General Law since 2010 where he was instrumental in Georgia's efforts on Criminal Justice Reform and passage of the Prescription Drug Monitoring Act (2011) to reduce opioid addiction statewide.  Setzler has been a consistent supporter of education reform in the state and served the Chair of Education Subcommittee on Academic Innovation.

As the lead sponsor of House Bill 1114 (2012), Setzler successfully led the effort to ban physician assisted suicide in Georgia. The legislation was introduced after Georgia's earlier law relating to public advertising of assisted suicide services was struck down by the Supreme Court of Georgia. Setzler supports biomedical research that uses pluripotent adult stem cells but opposes embryonic stem cell research that destroys a human embryo.

In 2015, Setzler introduced legislation to secure more revenue for transportation infrastructure by eliminating Georgia's 4 percent state sales tax on gasoline and levying a more consistent excise tax on each gallon of gasoline.  The bill would have lowered the state income tax rate, created a flatter tax structure, and "gradually raise the excise tax on fuel over eight years."

Setzler was an outspoken critic of proposals to expand access to medical marijuana in Georgia.

Personal life
Ed and his wife Tracie, a foreign language and history teacher, have four children and live in Acworth.

References

External links

Republican Party members of the Georgia House of Representatives
1970 births
Living people
21st-century American politicians